Jodorowsky/ Jodorowski is a spelling variation of Polish language surname . Surname is derived from Polish name Chodorów of Galician city Khodoriv.

It may refer to:
Adan Jodorowsky, French musician and actor, son of Alejandro
Alejandro Jodorowsky, Chilean-French filmmaker, playwright, and writer
Axel Jodorowsky, Mexican-French actor, writer, painter, playwright, son of Alejandro
Alma Jodorowsky, French actress, fashion model and singer, granddaughter of Alejandro, daughter of Brontis
Brontis Jodorowsky, French actor, son of Alejandro, father of Alma

See also
 Chodorow

Polish-language surnames
Surnames of Polish origin
Polish toponymic surnames